Aida Galymqyzy Balaeva (born 4 July 1974) is a Kazakh politician who serves as the Minister of Information and Social Development.

Biography 
Born in Jambyl, Balaeva graduated from the Abai Kazakh National Pedagogical University in 2000 with a degree in Russian language and literature, and then the Kazakh National Agrarian University in 2007 with a degree in law.

In 2010, she defended her academic title with a candidate of sociological sciences, the topic of the dissertation: “Ethno-religious identification of the youth of Kazakhstan: sociological aspect.”

From 1994 to 2004, Balaeva served a leading specialist in the department of analysis and coordination of socio-political processes of the Almaty Regional Information and Public Accord Department of the Ministry of Information and Public Accord as the acting head of the information department. 

From 2004 to 2006, she was the First Deputy Director of the Department of Internal Policy.

From 2006 to 2008, Balaeva was the Director of the Department of Internal Policy. 

From 2008 to 2010, she served the Director of the Department of Domestic Politics of Astana.

From February 2010 to December 2014, Balaeva was the deputy akim of Astana.

From 30 December 2014 to July 2019, she served as the Head of the Department of Internal Policy of the Presidential Administration of Kazakhstan.

On 22 July 2019, Balaeva was appointed as the Assistant to the President of Kazakhstan as the Head of the Division for Monitoring the Consideration of Appeals.

Since 4 May 2020, she's been serving as the Minister of Information and Social Development of Kazakhstan.

References 

1974 births
Living people
Ethnic Kazakh people
European sociologists
People from Almaty Region
Government ministers of Kazakhstan
Women sociologists
Asian sociologists